Gordon Kerr was a Scottish professional football goalkeeper who played in the Scottish League for Ayr United, Queen's Park, Albion Rovers and Bathgate.

Personal life 
Kerr served as a second lieutenant in the British Army during the First World War. He was admitted to hospital in France in December 1917.

Career statistics

References 

Scottish footballers
Scottish Football League players

Year of birth missing
Year of death missing
Place of death missing
Place of birth missing
British Army personnel of World War I
Association football goalkeepers
Queen's Park F.C. players
Ayr United F.C. players
Albion Rovers F.C. players
Bathgate F.C. players